Arthur Millert "Dutch" Gaustad (June 6, 1889 – March 23, 1945) was an American professional football player for the Minneapolis Marines. He was a member of the Marines from 1907, 14 years before the team entered the National Football League (NFL).

References
 

1889 births
1946 deaths
American football guards
Minneapolis Marines players
Players of American football from Minneapolis